The 1962 German football championship was the culmination of the football season in the Federal Republic of Germany in 1961–62. 1. FC Köln were crowned champions for the first time after a group stage and a final, having previously reached the final in 1960, where they lost to Hamburger SV.

On the strength of this title, the club participated in the 1962–63 European Cup, where Köln lost to Dundee F.C. in the preliminary round.

Runners-up 1. FC Nürnberg made its twelfth and last appearance in the national title game, having won the previous years championship.

The format used to determine the German champion was similar to the one used in the 1961 season. Nine clubs qualified for the tournament, with the runners-up of West and North having to play a qualifying match. The remaining eight clubs then played a single round in two groups of four, with the two group winners entering the final. In previous years, a home-and-away round had been played in the group stages but because of the 1962 FIFA World Cup, where Germany participated in, the schedule was reduced, as had been the case in previous world cup years.

Qualified teams
The teams qualified through the 1961–62 Oberliga season:

Competition

Qualifying round

Group 1

Group 2

Final

References

Sources
 kicker Allmanach 1990, by kicker, page 165 & 177 - German championship 1962

External links
 German Championship 1961-62 at Weltfussball.de
 Germany - Championship 1961-62 at RSSSF.com
 German championship 1962 at Fussballdaten.de

1962
1